The 26th AVN Awards ceremony, presented by Adult Video News (AVN), honored the best pornographic movies of 2008 and took place on January 10, 2009, at the Mandalay Bay Events Center in Paradise, Nevada. During the ceremony, Adult Video News presented AVN Awards (commonly referred to as Oscars of porn) in 127 categories released between Oct. 1, 2007 and Sept. 30, 2008. The ceremony, televised in the United States by Showtime, was produced by Gary Miller. Comedian Thea Vidale hosted the show for the second time, joined on stage by actresses Belladonna and Jenna Haze.

Pirates II: Stagnetti's Revenge won 15 awards, the most of the evening, including Best Video Feature and Best Director for Joone. Other winners included Fallen and Cheerleaders with four awards each and Icon, Not Bewitched XXX, and Big Wet Asses 13 with three apiece. Subsequent to the broadcast on Showtime, the show was issued on a two-disc DVD with hardcore excerpts of winning scenes added as extras.

Winners and nominees

The nominees for the 26th AVN Awards were announced on November 25, 2008, at 3:30 p.m. PST (23:30 UTC) in a press release, by David Sullivan. Pirates II: Stagnetti's Revenge received the most nominations with an unprecedented 30.

The winners were announced during the awards ceremony on January 10, 2009. Cry Wolf won what was to be the final award for Best Film; the award was discontinued the next year as film production gave way to digital video. Joone and Belladonna each won the most individual awards with three apiece, while projects they directed scooped up several more. The coveted performer of the year awards were won by Stoya (new starlet), Jenna Haze and James Deen.

Major Awards 

Winners are listed first and highlighted in boldface.

Additional Award Winners 
These awards were announced in a winners-only segment following the main portion of the event and were not  part of the televised awards show:

 Best Adult Website: Brazzers.com
 Best All-Girl Group Sex Scene: Jesse Jane, Shay Jordan, Stoya, Adrianna Lynn, Brianna Love, Lexxi Tyler, Memphis Monroe, Sophia Santi, Priya Rai, Cheerleaders
 Best All-Girl Release: Girlvana 4
 Best All-Girl Series: Women Seeking Women
 Best All-Girl 3-Way Sex Scene: Belladonna, Aiden Starr, Kimberly Kane, Belladonna's Girl Train
 Best All-Sex Release: Alexis Texas is Buttwoman
 Best Alternative Release: Spring Break 2008
 Best Amateur Release: ATK Exotics 2
 Best Amateur Series: Cherries
 Best Anal Themed Release: Weapons of Ass Destruction 6
 Best Anal-Themed Series: (Tie) Evil Anal and Butthole Whores 
 Best Animated Release: Night When Evil Falls, Vol. 1
 Best Art Direction: Pirates II: Stagnetti's Revenge
 Best BD/SM Release: House of Sex and Domination
 Best Big Bust Release: Big Tits at School
 Best Big Bust Series: Big Wet Tits
 Best Big Butt Release: Big Wet Asses 13
 Best Big Butt Series: Big Wet Asses
 Best Cinematography: Andrew Blake, Paid Companions
 Best Classic Release: Zazel: The Scent of Love
 Best Continuing Series: Ashlynn Goes to College
 Best Director–Ethnic Video: Jules Jordan, Lex the Impaler 3
 Best Director–Foreign Feature: Juan Carlos, Jesus Villaobos, Jason Colt: Mystery of the Sexy Diamonds
 Best Director–Foreign Non-Feature: Christoph Clark, Nasty Intentions 2
 Best Director–Non-Feature: Eli Cross, Icon
 Best Double Penetration Sex Scene: Jessica Drake, Eric Masterson, Brad Armstrong, Fallen
 Best DVD Extras: Pirates II: Stagnetti's Revenge
 Best DVD Menus: Fallen
 Best Editing: Joey Pulgades, Pirates II: Stagnetti's Revenge
 Best Educational Release: Tristan Taormino's Expert Guide to Oral Sex 2: Fellatio
 Best Ethnic-Themed Release–Asian: Asia Noir 6: Evil Sex Trap
 Best Ethnic-Themed Release–Black: Black Ass Addiction 2
 Best Ethnic-Themed Release–Latin: Mami Culo Grande 6
 Best Ethnic-Themed Series–Asian: Naughty Little Asians
 Best Ethnic-Themed Series–Black: Black Ass Addiction
 Best Ethnic-Themed Series–Latin: Young Tight Latinas
 Best Fem-Dom Strap On Release: Mean Bitches Erotic Femdom 3
 Best Foot/Leg Fetish Release: Belladonna's Foot Soldiers
 Best Foreign All-Sex Release: Rocco: Animal Trainer 25
 Best Foreign All-Sex Series: Ass Traffic
 Best Foreign Feature: Jason Colt: Mystery of the Sexy Diamonds
 Best Gonzo Series: Slutty and Sluttier
 Best Group Sex Scene: Hillary Scott, Heidi Mayne, Mark Davis, Alec Knight, Cheyne Collins, Alex Sanders, Icon
 Best High-Definition Production: Pirates II: Stagnetti's Revenge
 Best High-End All Sex Release: Icon
 Best Internal Release: All Internal 7
 Best Internal Series: Ass Cream Pies
 Best Interracial Series: It's Big, It's Black, It's Jack
 Best Makeup: Pirates II: Stagnetti's Revenge
 Best Male Newcomer: Anthony Rosano
 Best MILF Release: The Cougar Club
 Best MILF Series: Seasoned Players
 Best Music Soundtrack: The Bad Luck Betties
 Best New Line: Spearmint Rhino Films
 Best New Series: Ashlynn Goes to College
 Best New Video Production Company: Brazzers
 Best New Web Starlet: Bree Olson
 Best Non-Sex Performance: Nina Hartley, Not Bewitched XXX
 Best Online Marketing Campaign–Company Image: EvilAngel.com
 Best Online Marketing Campaign–Individual Project: RollerDollzXXX.com, Adam & Eve/Zero Tolerance Entertainment
 Best Oral-Themed Release: Blow Job Perversion
 Best Oral-Themed Series: Face Fucking, Inc.
 Best Orgy/Gang Bang Release: Big Boob Orgy
 Best Orgy/Gang Bang Series: Cream Pie Orgy
 Best Original Song: “Please,” Ethan Kane and Posse, Dark City
 Best Overall Marketing Campaign–Company Image: Digital Playground
 Best Overall Marketing Campaign–Individual Project: Pirates II: Stagnetti's Revenge
 Best Packaging: Fallen, Wicked Pictures
 Best Packaging Innovation: Burn, Vivid Entertainment
 Best POV Release: Jack's POV 9
 Best POV Series: Double Vision
 Best POV Sex Scene: Tory Lane, Katja Kassin, Erik Everhard, Double Vision 2
 Best Pro-Am Release: First Time Auditions 5
 Best Pro-Am Series: Bang Bus
 Best Retail Website: AdamEve.com
 Best Screenplay: Joone, Max Massimo, Pirates II: Stagnetti's Revenge
 Best Sex Scene In A Foreign-Shot Production: Bonny Bon, Anthony Hardwood, Mugar, Nick Lang, Frank Gun, Lauro Gotto, Ass Traffic 3
 Best Solo Release: All By Myself 3
 Best Solo Sex Scene: Teagan Presley, Not Bewitched XXX
 Best Spanking Release: Credit Card Fraud
 Best Special Effects: Pirates II: Stagnetti's Revenge
 Best Specialty Release–Other Genre: Milk Nymphos 2
 Best Specialty Series: Taboo
 Best Squirting Release: Jada Fire is Squirtwoman 3
 Best Squirting Series: Jada Fire Is Squirtwoman
 Best Supporting Actor: Ben English, Pirates II: Stagnetti's Revenge
 Best Supporting Actress: Belladonna, Pirates II: Stagnetti's Revenge
 Best Tease Performance: Jenna Haze, Pretty as They Cum
 Best Threeway Sex Scene: Jenny Hendrix, Delilah Strong & Michael Stefano, The Jenny Hendrix Anal Experience
 Best Transsexual Release: America's Next Top Tranny 2
 Best Transsexual Series: Transsexual Babysitters
 Best Videography: Joone, Oliver Henry, Pirates II: Stagnetti's Revenge
 Best Vignette Release: Cheerleaders
 Best Vignette Series: Cheating Wives Tales
 Best Young Girl Release: Jailbait 5
 Best Young Girl Series: It's a Daddy Thing
 Clever Title Of The Year: Strollin in the Colon, Hustler Video
 Director Of The Year: Brad Armstrong
 Female Foreign Performer Of The Year: Eve Angel
 The Jenna Jameson Crossover Star Of The Year: Katie Morgan
 Male Foreign Performer Of The Year: Rocco Siffredi
 MILF/Cougar Performer Of The Year: Lisa Ann
 Most Outrageous Sex Scene: “When There's No More Room at the Kandy Kat, the Dead Souls Will Blow You at Home,” Caroline Pierce, Christian, Rucca Page, Nikki Rhodes, Emma Cummings, Annie Cruz, Kaci Starr, Rebecca Lane, Kiwi Ling and numerous other Zombie Girls, Night of the Giving Head
 Transsexual Performer Of The Year: Wendy Williams
 Unsung Male Performer Of The Year: Charles Dera
 Unsung Starlet Of The Year: Amber Rayne

Honorary AVN Awards

Reuben Sturman Award
 None given this year

Hall of Fame 

AVN Hall of Fame inductees for 2009 were: Lisa Ann, Briana Banks, Jewel De'Nyle, Guy DiSilva, Wesley Emerson, Tim Lake, Mr. Marcus, Midori, Tera Patrick, Carter Stevens, Lexington Steele and Luc Wylder
 Founders Branch: Frank & Michael K., founders of IVD; Steven Toushin, founder of Bijou Video; Howie Klein & Al Bloom, founders of Caballero Home Video
 Internet Founders: Greg Clayman & Chuck Tsiamis, founders of Video Secrets; Andrew Conru, founder of Adult FriendFinder; Al Hadhazy, founder of iFriends and Amateur Hardcore; Ron Levi, founder of Cybererotica and CECash; David Van der Poel & Toine Rodenberg, founders of Python

Films with multiple nominations and awards

The following releases received the most nominations.

The following six films received the most awards:

The following individuals received multiple awards:
 3 awards: Belladonna, Joone
 2 awards: Lisa Ann, Brad Armstrong, Jessica Drake, Jenna Haze, Jesse Jane, Mr. Marcus, Stoya

Presenters and performers 
The following individuals presented awards or performed musical numbers.

Presenters

Performers

Ceremony Information

Although not scheduled to perform, rappers T-Pain and Flavor Flav jumped on stage to be part of the show during Flo Rida's performance of his hit song "Low" to open the show.

Among new categories for 2009, AVN recognized three web categories: Adult Site of the Year, Web Starlet of the Year, and Best New Web Starlet. Reviewers from TheBestPorn.com and RabbitsReviews.com and AVN Online staff made up the nominating committee. Also new was the Internet branch of the AVN hall of fame, which added five members.

Performance of year's movies

Cheerleaders was announced as the top selling and top renting movie of the previous year.

In Memoriam
AVN president Paul Fishbein gave a memorial tribute to 10 stalwarts of the adult industry who died in 2008. He dedicated the show to one of them, producer Dick Miller, a close friend of his.

See also

 AVN Award
 AVN Award for Male Performer of the Year
 AVN Female Performer of the Year Award
 List of members of the AVN Hall of Fame
 AVN Award for Male Foreign Performer of the Year
 2009 GayVN Awards

Notes

References

External links
 
 2009 AVN Award nominees (archived at Wayback Machine, March 27, 2009)
 Adult Video News Awards  at the Internet Movie Database
 

AVN Awards
2009 film awards